Midhat Pasha Souq also called Al-Taweel Souq (english: Long Market) is a historically important souq which forms the western fraction of the Street Called Straight in Damascus, Syria.

History
Souq Midhat Pasha is the oldest inhabited street in the world. It was built in 64 BC during the Roman Empire as a Street of Pillars. 

In 1878, during the Ottoman rule over Syria, it was named after Midhat Pasha.

During the Syrian Civil War, some demonstrations have taken place here.

See also
Al-Buzuriyah Souq
Al-Hamidiyah Souq
Bazaar
Bazaari 
Market (place)
Retail
Souq

References

Midhat Pasha